Rapid City Regional Airport  is a public use airport, nine miles southeast of Rapid City, in Pennington County, South Dakota, United States.

It is included in the Federal Aviation Administration (FAA) National Plan of Integrated Airport Systems for 2017–2021, in which it is categorized as a non-hub primary commercial service facility.

Facilities

It has two runways: 14/32 is  concrete and 5/23 is  asphalt. A near-parallel grass runway (13/31) exists approximately 2,400 feet from Runway 14/32; this runway, however, belongs to Dan's Airport , a small private airport.

A FedEx ATR-42-600 at the cargo ramp at Rapid City.

2021 Total Commercial Passengers: 690,740

Terminal 
The terminal building opened in 1988; a $20.5 million expansion and renovation designed by TSP Architecture was completed in 2012.  It includes 12,000 square feet of new floor space, the addition of three jet bridges and one boarding gate, an expanded security area with room for up to three lanes and body scanners, a new rental car wing, additional seating in the concourse, larger restrooms before and after security, modernized phone and data systems, new flight information boards, improved food service and shopping areas in the concourse, a rooftop patio, and energy-efficient windows and building exterior repair.

Airlines and destinations

As the main gateway airport to the Black Hills, the airport provides service to 11 destinations.

The following airlines offer scheduled passenger service:

Statistics

Carrier shares

Top destinations

Ground transportation
As of 2022, there is no public transit to Rapid City Regional Airport. The nearest Rapid City Rapid Ride bus stop is located over six miles away. There is an on-site shuttle service, Rapid Shuttle, Lyft, and Uber are private transportation options. Six car rental counters are available in the terminal.

References

External links
 Official airport website
   page from the South Dakota DOT Airport Directory
 
 
 

Airports in South Dakota
Transportation in Rapid City, South Dakota
Buildings and structures in Rapid City, South Dakota